Madison Lake (sometimes styled Lake Madison in publications up to the early part of the 20th century) is a lake in Blue Earth County, Minnesota, United States.
It is named after President James Madison The city of Madison Lake, Minnesota is located on the Northwest shoreline of the lake. The lake and the Point Pleasant resort have been long-noted fishing destinations. Madison Lake is part of the Le Sueur River watershed.

Ice Out Data

Madison Lake is notable in that reliable climatology data has been maintained for the last ice or "Ice Out" on the lake since 1927.  Data was recorded on a nearby barn from 1927 to 1940 Frank McCabe measured from 1940 to 1977. Local residents Mary and Dennis Buschkowsky measured diligently from 1977 through 2018 The Buschkowskys' nephew, Steve Schoeb continues to monitor starting in 2019.  The earliest ice-out recorded on the lake was March 8, 2000. The latest was April 30, 2018. The median ice out date as of 2020 is computed as April 5 or April 6.

References

External links
Minnesota DNR LakeFinder - Madison
Le Sueur River Watershed Minnesota PCA

Lakes of Minnesota
Lakes of Blue Earth County, Minnesota
Le Sueur River